The Kolkata Police Force (KPF) is one of the six presidency police forces of the Indian state of West Bengal. Kolkata Police has the task of policing the metropolitan area (apart from Bidhannagar and New Town, which are served by the Bidhannagar City Police, the area in Howrah City is managed by Howrah City Police and the area in Hooghly City is managed by Chandannagar Police Commissionerate) of Kolkata (formerly Calcutta), India, as defined under the Calcutta Police Act, 1866 and the Calcutta Suburban Police Act, 1866. The primary functions of the forces are maintaining law and order in the city, traffic management, prevention and detection of crime and co-ordinating various citizen-centric services for the people of Kolkata. , Kolkata Police has eight divisions covering 79 police stations. There are eight battalions of armed forces as well as specialised branches. The force also uses various modern technologies for effective handling of unconventional crimes, terrorism and related activities.

History

Early years (17th century)

The history of the present structure of policing in Kolkata goes back to East India company times, when the city was known as "Calcutta", and was an early settlement of the English East India Company. Calcutta was founded on the eastern banks of the Hooghly by an Englishman, Job Charnock in 1690. Policing in Calcutta's earliest days was confined to the Mughal administration and their local representatives. Bengal was still technically a part of the Mughal Empire, but the Nawabs of Bengal, based in Murshidabad in Northern South Bengal, were its effective rulers. The watch and ward functions were entrusted to a Kotwal or town prefect who had 45 peons under him, armed with traditional weapons like staves and spears, to deal with miscreants.

East India Company Police (1720–1845)
In 1720, the East India Company formally appointed an officer to be in charge of civil and criminal administration. He was assisted by an Indian functionary commonly known as black deputy or black zamindar. Under him were three naib-dewans, one of whom was in charge of the police. The settlement was divided into "thanas" (police stations) under "thanadars" who had in turn contingents of "naiks" and "paiks". A small contingent of river police was also formed. A statute passed in 1778 raised the strength of the police in Calcutta to 700 paiks, 31 thanadars and 34 naibs under a superintendent. In 1785 commissioners of conservancy were appointed for the town who also looked after watch and ward. Policing was still very loosely organised. In 1794, justices of peace were appointed for the municipal administration of Calcutta and its suburbs, under a chief magistrate who was directly in charge of the Police. In 1806 justices of peace were constituted as magistrates of 24 Parganas and parts of the adjacent districts within a 20-mile radius of the town.

Consolidation (1845–1866)
The middle decades of the 19th century witnessed a greater systematisation and institutionalisation of policing in Calcutta. In 1845 a committee under J.H. Patton brought about key changes in police organisation which now began to be modelled on the London Metropolitan Police. A Commissioner of Police was appointed with powers of a justice of peace to preserve law and order, detect crime and apprehend offenders. In 1856 the Governor-General promulgated an Act treating the Calcutta Police as a separate organisation and S. Wauchope, who was then the chief magistrate of Calcutta, was appointed as the first Commissioner of Police.

1857 was a difficult time for the English East India Company. The year saw the first upsurge against British rule. The rebellion led to the dissolution of the East India Company in 1858. It also led the British to reorganise the army, the financial system and the administration in India. The country was thereafter directly governed by the crown as the new British Raj. Commissioner Wauchope handled the situation ably and was knighted for his achievement. During the incumbency of his successor V.H. Schalch the Calcutta Police Act and the Calcutta Suburban Police Act were enacted in 1866.

Modernisation (1866–1947)
In 1868, Sir Stuart Hogg set up the Detective Department in Calcutta Police with A. Younan as the superintendent and R. Lamb as the first-class inspector. Hogg was both the Commissioner of Police and the Chairman of the Calcutta Municipal Corporation. Sir Fredrick Halliday, who was appointed as the Commissioner of Police in 1906, also introduced several changes in the administration of Calcutta Police including the system of running a Control Room. In response to the threat of the nationalist organisation Anushilan Samiti, Haliday oversaw the creation of the Special Branch in June 1909 on the recommendation of Sir Charles Augustus Tegart. For his numerous contributions to the growth of the city police, he is regarded as the father of modern Calcutta Police. Sir Charles Augustus Tegart headed the Detective Department was the first cadre of the Indian Police (IP) force in the organisation. He reorganised the city police force and made it efficient. A highly decorated officer, he was the Commissioner of Police from 1923 to 1931 and was admired for keeping the city free from crime. However, he was unpopular with freedom fighters and his encounters with revolutionaries are a part of popular Bengali folklore. The same time saw the rise of three Bengali police officers named Ramgati Banerjee, Sukumar Sengupta and Zakir Hussain. During the Salt March movement in 1930, the Calcutta Police was headed by Charles Tegart as Police Commissioner, Ramgati Banerjee as DC (South) and Sukumar Sengupta as DC (North). Later, Banerjee left his position and took up teaching as a profession, and Hussain left the job to become the First Inspector-General of East Pakistan. Sukumar Sengupta continued in the job to become the first Bengali Inspector General of Police, West Bengal soon after independence.

Post-independence (1947 onward)

The colonial history of the Calcutta Police force was primarily repressive and anti-nationalist. After India gained independence from British rule in 1947, Calcutta Police was re-organised as an essential element of the Indian law enforcement agencies. Surendra Nath Chatterjee was the first Indian Commissioner of Police. As of 2014, Kolkata Police has eight divisions covering 70 police stations. There are eight battalions of armed forces as well as specialised branches.

Logo
Each symbol of the Kolkata Police seal has a special significance. At the centre is the Ashok Stambha, which has been adopted from Ashoka's Sarnath Lion Capital. The 24-spoked wheel is referred to as the Dharmachakra. Dharma or religion is the manifestation of the inner conscience and as Swami Vivekananda said: "Religion is the manifestation of the divinity already in man". Below the Dharmachakra is inscribed "Satyameva Jayate" which signifies that Truth always prevails. In between the two circles, which encircle the Ashok Stambha, is the symbolic peacock, which is the national bird. The seal signifies upholding truth, valour and justice. "We who enforce the law must not merely obey it. We have an obligation to set a moral example, which those whom we protect can follow."

Organizational structure

, Kolkata Police has eight divisions covering 79 police stations. The commissioner is the chief of the Kolkata Police. The commissioner is appointed by the Government of West Bengal and reports independently to the Home Minister of the State. The headquarters are at 18, Lalbazar Street, near B.B.D. Bagh  area  in Central Kolkata. The commissioner is an Indian Police Service officer of the rank of Additional DG & IG of police. Shri Vineet Goyal (IPS) is the present commissioner. The state government vests the commissioner with the powers of a magistrate of First Class with limits within the suburbs of Calcutta. He has power to issue orders with his discretion.

Units

Divisions
 South Division
 North and North Suburban Division
 Central Division
 Eastern Suburban Division
 Port Division
 South East Division
 South Suburban Division (Jadavpur Division)
 South West Division (Behala Division)
 East Division

Branches
 Detective Department
 Special Branch
 Enforcement Branch
 Kolkata Traffic Police
 Reserve Force
 Wireless Branch
 Security Control Organisation

Other units
 Police Training School
 Home Guard Organisation
 Special Task Force
 The Kolkata Armed Police (KAP) are West Bengal's state armed police force for operations in Kolkata. The KAP is part of the KPF and consists of eight battalions and three special units. The special units are the RAF, the Special Action Force (SAF, approx. 160 members),  the Commando Force (approximately 200 members) and the Combat Force.

Rank structure

The rank structure of Kolkata Police officers is as follows (in descending order of seniority):
 Commissioner of Police
 (One) Special Commissioner of Police
 (Six) Additional Commissioners of Police
 (Five) Joint Commissioners of Police
 Deputy Commissioners of Police
 Assistant Commissioners of Police
 Inspectors
 Sub-Inspector/Wireless Supervisor/Sergeant/Subedar
 Assistant Sub-Inspector
 Naik
 Constable/Sepoy
 Wireless Helper
 Junior Constable 
 Home Guard
 Civic Volunteer 
 Traffic Volunteer 
 Kolkata Green Police.

Jurisdiction
The jurisdiction of the Kolkata Police covers the area of Kolkata District and an adjacent area as well. That adjacent area, like Kolkata District, is within the boundaries of the Kolkata Municipal Corporation. The Kolkata Police's entire area comprises all 144 wards of the KMC.

Administration

Particulars of the Kolkata Police Commissionerate, functions and duties

Commissioner of Police, Kolkata, is the Executive and Administrative Head of Kolkata Police Force. Under his command and control, there are:

Police stations
Police stations under the jurisdiction of Kolkata Police are as follows:

 Alipore
 Amherst Street
 Amherst Street Women
 Anandapur
 Ballygunge
 Bansdroni
 Behala
 Behala Women
 Beliaghata
 Beniapukur
 Bhowanipur
 Bowbazar
 Burrabazar
 Burtolla
 Charu Market
 Chetla
 Chitpur
 Cossipore
 Ekbalpur
 Entally
 Garden Reach
 Garfa
 Gariahat
 Girish Park
 Golf Green
 Hare Street
 Haridevpur
 Hastings
 Jadavpur
 Jorabagan
 Jorasanko
 Kalighat
 Kolkata Leather Complex
Karaya
 Karaya Women
 Kasba
 Lake
 Maidan
 Maniktala
 Metiabruz
 Muchipara
 Nadial
 Narkeldanga
 Netaji Nagar
 New Alipore
 New Market
 North Port
 Panchasayar
 Park Street
 Parnashree
 Patuli
 Patuli Women
 Phoolbagan
 Posta
 Pragati Maidan
 Purba Jadavpur
 Rabindra Sarobar
 Rajabagan
 Regent Park
 Sarsuna
 Shakespeare Sarani
 Shyampukur
 Sinthee
 South Port
 Survey Park
 Tala
 Taltala
 Taltala Women
 Tangra
 Taratala
 Thakurpukur
 Tiljala
 Tollygunge
 Tollygunge Women
 Topsia
 Ultadanga
 Ultadanga Women
 Watgunge
 Watgunge Women
 West Port

See also
 Divisions of Kolkata Police
 West Bengal Police
 CID West Bengal
 Bidhannagar Police Commissionerate
 Barrackpore Police Commissionerate
 Chandannagar Police Commissionerate
 Howrah Police Commissionerate
 Asansol–Durgapur Police Commissionerate
 Siliguri Police Commissionerate
 Indian Imperial Police
 Kolkata Police Friendship Cup Football Tournament
 Kolkata Police community policing initiatives

References

 "Evolution of the Calcutta Police: A Calcutta Police presentation on the occasion of the Calcutta Tercentenary, 1990", Calcutta Police, 1990

External links

 

Organisations based in Kolkata
 
Government agencies established in 1856
1856 establishments in British India
Police Commissionerate in West Bengal